Bruno Mignot (born 15 April 1958) is a French former professional football player and manager. In his career, during which he played as a defender, he made a total of twenty-seven Division 1 appearances.

Personal life 
Mignot has four children: Jean-Pascal, Bertrand, Alice, and Julie. Jean-Pascal and Bertrand both became footballers. As of 2013, Bruno had three grandchildren.

Following his football career, Mignot pursued university studies to become a teacher. He is the co-founder of Passion Foot, an organization devoted to children's football.

Honours 
Rouen

 Division 2: 1981–82

References 

1958 births
Living people
Sportspeople from Seine-Maritime
French footballers
Association football defenders
INF Vichy players
SC Bastia players
FC Rouen
FC Libourne players
USF Fécamp players
French Division 3 (1971–1993) players
Ligue 1 players
Ligue 2 players
French football managers
US Alençon managers
CMS Oissel managers
French Division 4 (1978–1993) managers
French Division 3 (1971–1993) managers
Championnat National managers
Championnat National 2 managers
Championnat National 3 managers
Footballers from Normandy